"Guantanamera" (Spanish: (the woman) from Guantánamo) is a Cuban patriotic song, which uses a poem by the Cuban poet José Martí for the lyrics. The official writing credits have been given to Joseíto Fernández, who first popularized the song on radio as early as 1929 (although it is unclear when the first release as a record occurred). In 1966, a version by American vocal group the Sandpipers, based on an arrangement by the Weavers from their May 1963 Carnegie Hall Reunion concert, became an international hit. The song has notably been covered or interpolated by Pete Seeger, Celia Cruz, and Wyclef Jean.

Lyrics

By José Martí

The better known "official" lyrics are based on selections from the poetry collection Versos Sencillos (Simple Verses) by Cuban poet and independence hero José Martí, as adapted by Julián Orbón. The four verses of the song were adapted from four stanzas of Versos Sencillos, each from a different poem. They are presented here in the original Spanish (poem:stanza).

By Joseíto Fernández
Given the song's musical structure, which fits A–B–A–B (sometimes A–B–B–A) octosyllabic verses, "Guantanamera" lent itself from the beginning to impromptu verses, improvised on the spot, similar to what happens with the Mexican folk song "La Bamba". Joseíto Fernández first used the tune to comment on daily events on his radio program by adapting the lyrics to the song's melody, and then using the song to conclude his show. Through this use, "Guantanamera" became a popular vehicle for romantic, patriotic, humorous, or social commentary in Cuba and elsewhere in the Spanish-speaking world.

The lyrics often sung by Fernández are about a peasant woman or country girl from Guantánamo (" Guantanamera"), with whom he once had a romantic relationship, and who eventually left him. Fernández provided several explanations during his lifetime, including that she did not have a romantic interest in him, but merely a platonic one.

By other artists

Various other versions have combined lyrics based on the José Martí poem.  Additional verses commonly sung are:

Y para el cruel que me arranca
el corazón con que vivo
cardo ni oruga cultivo
cultivo la rosa blanca.
Yo sé de un pesar profundo
entre las penas sin nombre:
la esclavitud de los hombres
es la gran pena del mundo.
No me pongan en lo oscuro
A morir como un traidor
Yo soy bueno y como bueno
Moriré de cara al sol

Music
The music for the song is sometimes also attributed to Joseíto Fernández, who claimed to have written it at various dates (consensus puts 1929 as its year of origin), and who used it regularly in one of his radio programs. Some claim that the song's structure actually came from Herminio "El Diablo" García Wilson, who could be credited as a co-composer. García's heirs took the matter to court decades later, but lost the case; the People's Supreme Court of Cuba credited Fernández as the sole composer of the music in 1993. Regardless of either claim, Fernández can safely be claimed as being the first to promote the song widely through his radio programs.

Pete Seeger version
Shortly after the Weavers’ Carnegie Hall reunion concert recording in May 1963, Pete Seeger included the song on his album We Shall Overcome, which was also performed live at Carnegie Hall. Seeger's recording is described by Stewart Mason at Allmusic as the "definitive version" of the song.

The version of the song created by Martí and Orbón was used by Seeger as the basis of his reworked version, which he based on a performance of the song by Héctor Angulo. Seeger combined Martí's verse with the tune, with the intention that it be used by the peace movement at the time of the Cuban Missile Crisis. He urged that people sing the song as a symbol of unity between the American and Cuban peoples, and called for it to be sung in Spanish to "hasten the day [that] the USA... is some sort of bilingual country."

The Sandpipers version

The most commercially successful version of "Guantanamera" in the English-speaking world was recorded by the easy listening vocal group, The Sandpipers, in 1966. Their recording was based on the Weavers' 1963 Carnegie Hall reunion concert rendition and was arranged by Mort Garson and produced by Tommy LiPuma. In addition to the group's vocals, the version includes Robie Lester on background vocals and narration by producer LiPuma. It reached No. 9 on the Billboard Hot 100 and No. 7 on the UK Singles Chart.

Charts 
Single chart usages for Dutch100
Single chart usages for Dutch100

Celia Cruz version 
"Guantanamera" is one of the songs most commonly identified with Cuban singer Celia Cruz (1925–2003). It appears on at least 241 different records or compilations of hers, her earliest commercial recording of it being on the Mexican label Tico Records in 1968. She mentions her special memories of singing "Guantanamera" nine times in her posthumous 2004 autobiography.

Charts

Wyclef Jean version 

Wyclef Jean's version of the song is not a cover of the original, but an incorporation with additional lyrics/music. The album version of the song featured singing by Jeni Fujita alongside Celia Cruz (who re-recorded her vocals for the song), with an additional rap verse by Lauryn Hill. 

The song was nominated for a Grammy Award for Best Rap Performance by a Duo or Group. The song peaked at number 29 on the Billboard Rhythmic Airplay chart, and peaked within the top 40 in several countries, including the United Kingdom. Former United States President Barack Obama listed the song on his 2022 summer playlist.

Charts

Other recordings
It has been recorded by many other solo artists, notably by Demis Roussos, Willy Chirino, Julio Iglesias, Joan Baez, Albita, Jimmy Buffett, Bobby Darin, Raul Malo, Joe Dassin, Muslim Magomayev, José Feliciano, Tony Mottola, Biser Kirov, Puerto Plata, Trini Lopez, La Lupe, Nana Mouskouri, Tito Puente, Raulín Rodríguez, Andy Russell, Gloria Estefan, Robert Wyatt (under the title "Caimanera"), and by such groups as The Mavericks, Buena Vista Social Club, Los Lobos, Pozo-Seco Singers, Todos Tus Muertos, The Spinners and the Gipsy Kings.

In popular culture

 The tune of this song is a commonly used in British football chant, such as "There's only one [insert player/manager name]". For example, it was used for Paul Gascoigne ("There's only one Paul Gascoigne"), but modified for Gary Stevens ("There's only two Gary Stevens") since there were two players of the same name active at the same time. Other chants using the same tune include "You only sing when you're winning", and "You're getting sacked in the morning". It is also used on the soundtrack of Pro Evolution Soccer 2014, a football video game developed and published by Konami. Captain Morgan Original Spiced Rum's 2019 television commercial campaign also features this chant. Real Madrid also use this tune to sing “Reyes de Europa”. 
 Comedy by Paul Kelly and the Messengers features a hidden song, fading to silence, singing "there's only one David Gower".
 Tony Lockett, a player in the Australian Football League, was praised in the song "One Tony Lockett", using the tune of "Guantanamera", performed by James Freud and the Reserves.
 The song is played in The Godfather Part II, at the New Year's Eve party in Cuba where Michael Corleone tells his brother Fredo Corleone that he knows that he betrayed him.
 Richard Stallman wrote and sang a version titled Guantanamero, an ironic commentary on the Guantanamo prison and the War on Terror.
 On the Saturday Night Live episode of October 27, 1990, Patrick Swayze and Dana Carvey perform a fake ad about a fake compilation album called "Super Feud" show in which two famous singers, Valendez and Montenero, brag about how much fan mail they receive - starting with "one ton of fan mail," followed by "two tons of fan mail" - to the tune of Guantanamera. 
 Pakistani pop star Alamgir recorded an adaptation in the 1980s interspersed with unrelated Urdu lyrics, titled Albela Rahi, which has become an informal signature tune and title for the singer (now based in the United States).
 In a flashback scene on season 3 episode 3 of Money Heist, Berlin (Pedro Alonso) danced to the song recording by Compay Segundo after telling the Professor his plan of breaking into the vault of gold bars at the Bank of Spain.

References

External links
 [http://www.exilio.com/Marti/Marti.html José Martí's poem Versos Sencillos], from which the verses of Guantanamera were taken.
 http://www.cubamusic.com/Store/Artist/66/joseito-fernandez

1929 songs
1966 singles
A&M Records singles
1997 singles
Celia Cruz songs
Cuban songs
Football songs and chants
Guantánamo
Joan Baez songs
Lauryn Hill songs
Cuban patriotic songs
The Sandpipers songs
Pete Seeger songs
Song recordings produced by Jerry Duplessis
Song recordings produced by Wyclef Jean
Spanish-language songs
Trini Lopez songs
Wyclef Jean songs
La India songs
Songs about Cuba